Darquavis Lamar "Dar" Tucker (born April 11, 1988) is an American-Jordanian professional basketball player. He played college basketball at DePaul University.

High school
Tucker attended Arthur Hill High School, in Saginaw, Michigan, where he played high school basketball.

College career
Tucker played college basketball at DePaul University, with the DePaul Blue Demons, from 2007 to 2009.

Professional career
In both 2010 and 2011, Tucker won the D-League Slam Dunk Contest and was named the D-League's Most Improved Player in 2011.

For the 2011–12 season, he played Aix Maurienne Savoie Basket of France. He returned to Aix Maurienne for 2013–14.

On March 16, 2015, he was acquired by the Reno Bighorns of the NBA Development League, returning to the team for a second stint. On March 28, he tied the NBA D-League's single-game scoring record when he scored 58 points in a game against the Texas Legends and averaged 34.6 points, 10.1 rebounds and 1.6 assists per contest in 8 games. On April 23, after the conclusion of the 2014–2015 D-League season, he signed with Trotamundos de Carabobo of the Venezuelan Liga Profesional de Baloncesto. On May 30, he signed with Al-Manama of the Bahraini Premier League.

National team career
Tucker has been a member of the senior Jordanian national basketball team. With Jordan, he played at the 2016 FIBA Asia Challenge.

References

External links
FIBA Profile
Latinbasket.com Profile
NBA D-League Profile
DePaul College Bio

1988 births
Living people
20th-century African-American people
21st-century African-American sportspeople
2019 FIBA Basketball World Cup players
African-American basketball players
Aix Maurienne Savoie Basket players
American expatriate basketball people in Argentina
American expatriate basketball people in the Dominican Republic
American expatriate basketball people in France
American expatriate basketball people in Venezuela
American men's basketball players
Basketball players from Michigan
DePaul Blue Demons men's basketball players
Estudiantes Concordia basketball players
Flamengo basketball players
Huracanes del Atlántico players
Jordanian men's basketball players
Los Angeles D-Fenders players
New Mexico Thunderbirds players
Parade High School All-Americans (boys' basketball)
Reno Bighorns players
San Lorenzo de Almagro (basketball) players
Shooting guards
Sportspeople from Saginaw, Michigan
Texas Legends players
Trotamundos B.B.C. players